Toto Seeks Peace is a 1954 Italian comedy film directed by Mario Mattoli and starring Totò.

Plot
Two widowers decide to get married but their decision is continually hampered by their grandchildren, who are just interested in their inheritance.

Cast
 Totò as Gennaro Piselli
 Ave Ninchi as Gemma Torresi Piselli 
 Enzo Turco as Pasquale
 Paolo Ferrari as Cousin Celestino
 Isa Barzizza as Cousin Nella Caporali
Nino Vingelli as the waiter
Vincenzo Talarico as the  lawyer
Gina Amendola: Adele
Ughetto Bertucci as a witness
Mario Castellani as a witness

References

Bibliography
 Aprà, Adriano. The Fabulous Thirties: Italian cinema 1929-1944. Electa International, 1979.

External links

1954 films
1950s Italian-language films
1954 comedy films
Italian black-and-white films
Films set in Florence
Films directed by Mario Mattoli
Films with screenplays by Ruggero Maccari
Films scored by Carlo Savina
Italian comedy films
Titanus films
1950s Italian films